Strange Days is a 2019 jazz album by Belgian singer Natacha Atlas. The album is recorded in English and Arabic.

Singers Joss Stone and Sofiane Saïdi are featured on the album. Musicians performing on Strange Days include trumpeter Hayden Powell, pianist Alcyona Mick, drummer Asaf Sirkis, Idris Rahman, and cellist Ivan Hussey. The album was released in digital, CD and LP formats. The track "Lost Revolutions" references Atlas' 2011 song, "Egypt: Rise to Freedom", released in celebration of Egypt's January 25 Revolution.

Production
Strange Days was recorded in London, Brazil and France and executive produced by Michael Janisch.

Track listing

References

2019 albums
Jazz albums by Belgian artists
Arabic-language albums
Natacha Atlas albums